The RagWing RW8 PT2S is a single or two seat, high wing, strut-braced, single engine ultralight aircraft designed by Roger Mann and sold as plans by RagWing Aircraft Designs for amateur construction.

Design and development
The RW8 was designed for the US experimental homebuilt aircraft category for single seat flying or as a US FAR 103 Ultralight Vehicles two-seat ultralight trainer and first flown in 1993.

The airframe is constructed entirely from wood and covered with aircraft fabric. The landing gear is of conventional configuration with bungee suspension with tricycle gear optional.

The PT2S is only offered as plans and the designer estimates it will take 500 hours to complete the aircraft.

Variants
RW8 PT2S
Two seat side-by-side configuration ultralight trainer, Pilot Trainer, 2 Seat
RW8 ALF
Single seat Affordable Light Flyer

Specifications (RW8)

References

External links

1990s United States ultralight aircraft
Homebuilt aircraft